Constructionism may refer to 

 Constructionism (learning theory), an educational philosophy developed by Seymour Papert
 Social constructionism, a theory of how social phenomena or objects of consciousness develop in social contexts
 Strict constructionism, a conservative type of legal or constitutional interpretation

See also
 Constructivism (disambiguation)